Ahangaran-e Olya (also Romanized as Āhangarān-e ‘Olyā) is a village in Itivand-e Shomali Rural District, Kakavand District, Delfan County, Lorestan Province, Iran. At the 2006 census, its population was 139, in 35 families.

References 

Towns and villages in Delfan County